Social Democratic Left Party of Sweden (SSV) was a political party formed in 1921 after a split from the original SSV.

When the original SSV approved the 21 theses of the Communist International and in so doing changed its name to SKP (Communist Party of Sweden) in 1921, an anti-ComIntern minority was expelled and founded its own "SSV". This "SSV" existed between 1921 and 1923. The leader of this party was Ivar Vennerström. "SSV" participated in two elections, the parliamentary election of 1921 and the municipal election of 1922. In 1923 it merged with the Social Democrats.

Västerbottens Folkblad, a newspaper published in Umeå, was then a publication of this tendency. Today it is a social democratic magazine.

References

External links
 1921 election manifesto of the party
 Västerbottens Folkblad
 Info on VF at the Royal Library

Political parties established in 1921
Social democratic parties
Defunct socialist parties in Sweden
1921 establishments in Sweden
Political parties disestablished in 1923